The franc was the currency of the Swiss canton of Vaud between 1798 and 1850. It was subdivided into 10 batz, each of 10 rappes. The usual price unit was the Batz. It was worth th the French silver écu or 6.67 g fine silver.

History

The Frank was the currency of the Helvetian Republic from 1798. The Helvetian Republic ceased issuing coins in 1803. Vaud issued coins between 1804 and 1834. In 1850, the Swiss franc was introduced, with an exchange rate of 1 Vaud franc = 1.4597 Swiss francs.

Coins
Billon coins were issued in denominations of 1 and  rappes,  and 1 batz, with silver coins for 5, 10, 20 and 40 batz and 1 franc.

References

External links
 

Modern obsolete currencies
Currencies of Switzerland
Canton of Vaud
1804 establishments in Switzerland
1850 disestablishments in Switzerland